Masahiro Anzai (Anzai Masahiro) (26 November 1954 – 15 March 2021) was a Japanese voice actor and actor.

Biography
He retired from acting in 1997 due to his treatment for diabetes, which caused his lower left leg to be amputated and blindness in the eye. He died of acute heart failure on 15 March 2021.

Filmography

Television animation
Urusei Yatsura (1982-1986), Ryunosuke's father
Creamy Mami, the Magic Angel (1983-1984), Midori Kisaragi
Sakigake!! Otokojuku (1988), Dokugantetsu, Mick Kong, other roles
The Jungle Book (1989), Bacchus
Brave Exkaiser (1990-1991), Mario
Genji Tsūshin Agedama (1991-1992), Ebiten, The owner of Ganko-Tei
Sangokushi (1991-1992), Dian Wei
Sailor Moon (1992), Rhett Butler
Yadamon (1992-1993), Butch
Yamato Takeru (1994), Ouka
Bonobono (1995-1996), Beaver-san
Romeo's Blue Skies (1995), Marchelo Rossi
Slayers (1995-1997) Philionel El Di Seyruun (Season 1 and 2 only)

Original video animation (OVA)
Birth (1984), Inorganic Biker Kid/Kooni
Twilight Q - part 1 (1987), Uemura
Zillion: Burning Night (1988), Nabaro
Crows (1994), Genjirō Katsuragi

Theatrical animation
Urusei Yatsura 2: Beautiful Dreamer (1984)
Urusei Yatsura 3: Remember My Love (1985)
Wings of Honnêamise (1987), Majaho
Urusei Yatsura 5: The Final Chapter (1988)
Urusei Yatsura 6: Always My Darling (1991)

Tokusatsu
Dengeki Sentai Changeman (1985), Dodon

Dubbing

Live-action
Dangerous Minds, Hal Griffith (George Dzundza)
Friends, Jack Geller (Elliott Gould)
Léon: The Professional, Mathilda's Father (Michael Badalucco)
Loaded Weapon 1, Rick Becker (Jon Lovitz)
Pee-wee's Big Adventure, Francis Buxton (Mark Holton)
Sneakers, Darren Roskow (Dan Aykroyd)

Animation
Thumbelina, Grundel

References

External links

1954 births
2021 deaths
Nihon University alumni
Male voice actors from Tokyo